A8, A08, A 8 or A-8 may refer to:

Electronics
 ARM Cortex-A8, a processor used in mobile devices
 Apple A8, a 64-bit system on a chip (SoC) designed by Apple Inc.
AMD A8, an AMD APU
 Samsung Galaxy A8, various smartphones
 Atari 8-bit family, a series of 8-bit home computers

Military
 Curtiss A-8, a United States attack aircraft used in the 1930s 
A8, the military staff designation in the continental staff system for air force headquarters staff concerned with finance
 A8, a model of German Aggregate Series Rocket from World War II
 A 8, a Swedish artillery regiment

Transport, vehicles and vessels
 Arrows A8, a 1985 British racing car
 Audi A8, a flagship full-sized luxury sedan
 , an A-class submarine of Britain's Royal Navy
 LNER Class A8, a British 4-6-2T steam locomotive class

Air transport
 Curtiss A-8, a United States attack aircraft used in the 1930s 
 A08, the FAA Location Identifier for Vaiden Field
 A8, the aircraft registration prefix for Liberia
 A8, the IATA code for Benin Golf Air airlines

Other uses
 A8 (classification), an amputee sport classification
 ATC code A08 Antiobesity preparations, excluding diet products, a subgroup of the Anatomical Therapeutic Chemical Classification System
 A08, Encyclopaedia of Chess Openings code for Réti Opening
 A8, in the aquatic communities in the British National Vegetation Classification system
 A8, an ISO 216 international standard paper size
 A8 road, in several countries
 Subfamily A8, in the rhodopsin-like receptors subfamily of proteins
 The A8 countries, short for "accession eight", the ex-communist European countries that acceded to the EU in 2004
 A8, the latest version of the Gamestudio game engine
Asphalt 8 a Gameloft mobile racing game

See also
8A (disambiguation)